Eric Castle is a former professional American football player who played defensive back for four seasons for the San Diego Chargers. Castle currently coaches elementary and middle school track and field at St. Clare School in Portland, Oregon.

References

1970 births
American football cornerbacks
Oregon Ducks football players
San Diego Chargers players
Living people
People from Longview, Washington
Players of American football from Washington (state)